Clipper is a nickname for:

 Clipper Flynn (1849–1881), American professional baseball player
 Felipe Montemayor (born 1928), Mexican player in Major League Baseball
 John "Clipper" Smith (1904–1973), American football player, coach and college athletics administrator; member of the College Football Hall of Fame
 Maurice J. "Clipper" Smith (1898–1984), American football player and coach of football, basketball and baseball

See also 

 
 
 Joe DiMaggio (1914–1999), American Hall-of-Fame Major League Baseball player nicknamed the "Yankee Clipper"
 Norman Kwong (1929–2016), Canadian Football League player, sports executive and Lieutenant Governor of Alberta, nicknamed the "China Clipper"

Lists of people by nickname